Tony Aitken (born 20 June 1946) is an English actor, known for playing a variety of parts in popular television programmes.

He attended Belmont Abbey School, Hereford, 1959–64. He was active in the amateur dramatic society, appearing in many revues, plays and Gilbert and Sullivan productions. He acted with Neville Buswell another student at the school. Trained as a Drama and Art Teacher at St. Mary's University College, London 1964–67.

Over a forty five year career in theatre and TV, he has appeared regularly in series such as The Sweeney, Porridge, Monty Python’s Flying Circus (Ep27,woman in launderette), The Mistress, Agatha Christie's Poirot, Holby City, Casualty, End of Part One and No. 73, in films such as Robin Hood Junior, Jabberwocky, Quincy's Quest and The Remains of the Day in which he played the Postmaster.

His best-known role is perhaps as the "Merry Balladeer" in the closing titles of Blackadder II, in which he also played the madman ("pity poor Tom") in "Money".
In addition to his acting career, he now runs a broadcast audio studio, producing and voicing radio and TV commercials.
In 2011 he played the part of solicitor "Ben Dean" in several episodes of Coronation Street.
He played "Professor Aubrey" in the Feature Film "The Arbiter" 2013.

Filmography

References

External links
 

English male television actors
English male film actors
1946 births
Living people
People from Solihull
Male actors from Warwickshire
20th-century English male actors
21st-century English male actors